Yerma is a 1934 play by García Lorca

Yerma may also refer to:
 Yerma (1984 film)
 Yerma (1998 film)
 Yerma (opera)

See also 
 Jerma (disambiguation)